The 2020 season was the 113th season in which the Richmond Football Club has participated in the VFL/AFL and the first season in which it participated in the AFL Women's competition.

Impact of COVID-19 pandemic
The 2020 season was disrupted by the COVID-19 pandemic, which was formally declared a pandemic on 11 March 2020, eight days prior to the scheduled start of the AFL premiership season and 18 days prior to the final round of the AFL season.

AFL
Prior to the commencement of the season, the fixture was shortened from 22 matches per team to 17, under the expectation that matches would be forced to stop at the peak of the disease.

The season commenced on 19 March as originally scheduled, but the introduction of restrictions (and later of formal quarantines) on interstate travel, resulted in suspension of the season after round one. During that round, matches were played in empty stadiums for the first time in the league's history.

Throughout the season, matches were played for a shortened length of 16 minutes plus time on per quarter, instead of 20 minutes plus time on. This was originally done at the start of the season, in the hope that playing shorter games could facilitate more frequent games than weekly, maximising the games which could be played before the anticipated suspension of the season. Though the initial run of games lasted just one week, the shortened game time was retained after the season's resumption to allow make-up games to be more easily scheduled between rounds when matches were postponed or refixtured.

On 15 May, as most states began easing restrictions, the league's plan to resume the season was announced: clubs began non-contact training from 18 May, and full contact training from 25 May, ahead of resuming competitive matches from 11 June, with the revised fixture released gradually throughout the year, and changing regularly and often at short notice when the situation forced it.

The sizes of allowable crowds changed as the season progressed, with early season Queensland and New South Wales crowds limited to only a few hundred, while half crowds were allowed in the largely virus-free Western Australia from Round 7.

Following a virus outbreak in Melbourne in June, Richmond's base of operations was relocated to the Gold Coast, alongside eight other Victorian clubs. The club played the remainder of their home games in the state, other than when travelling to other virus-free locations.

AFLW
In the AFLW, all matches played from 14 March onwards were played to empty stadiums. The final two rounds of the home-and-away season were scratched and though Richmond did not qualify, the finals series was brought forward by two weeks and cancelled without a premier being awarded after just four finals matches were played.

VFL and VFLW
The final weeks of the VFL pre-season series and the commencement of the season-proper were delayed in March due to the greater risk of external threats in the semi-professional state league environment. Eventually, all AFL clubs withdrew from the competition and the season was cancelled in June. Richmond reserves players participated in ad hoc scratch matches against other clubs during the season and on occasion played in multi-club teams alongside rival players. The VFLW season was likewise delayed and eventually cancelled.

AFL

2019 off-season list changes

Retirements and delistings

Free agency

Trades

National draft

2020 squad

2020 season

Marsh Community Series

Home and away season

Finals

Ladder

Awards

League awards

All-Australian team

Brownlow Medal tally

22 Under 22 team

Club awards

Jack Dyer Medal

Michael Roach Medal

AFL Women's

List building and recruitment

Expansion signings

Trades

Academy/VFLW pre-list signings

National draft

2020 squad

2020 season

Home and away season
Note: The final two rounds of the season were cancelled to bring forward the finals series in response to the coronavirus pandemic.

Awards

League awards

All-Australian team

22 Under 22 team

Club awards

Best and Fairest award

Leading goalkicker award

VFL/VFLW seasons (cancelled)

Richmond had been expected to field a reserves men's team in the Victorian Football League for a seventhh consecutive season, defending their 2019 premiership. In March, the AFL issued a direction to all 18 clubs mandating that no AFL-listed player at a club could participate in a second-tier state league amidst the COVID-19 pandemic and in July, the season was formally cancelled for all participant clubs. Likewise, the club did not field a team in the VFL Women's competition as that season was also cancelled.

References

External links 
 Richmond Tigers Official AFL Site
 Official Site of the Australian Football League

Richmond Football Club seasons
Richmond